Noontha? is a Maldivian anthology web series written and directed by Ahmed Iqbal & Naaisha Nashid. The first episode titled "Rules & Regulations" was released on 22 December 2021 and stars Nuzuhath Shuaib, Ahmed Asim and Adhuham Layaal Qasim in main roles. The series where characters break the fourth wall, narrates the modern relationship of a love triangle. The second segment titled "Bits & Pieces" was written and directed by Naaisha Nashid which revolves around a professional interior designer, played by Washiya Mohamed was released on 30 January 2022.

Cast

Main
Rules & Regulations
 Nuzuhath Shuaib as Sana
 Ahmed Asim as Sanim
 Adhuham Layaal Qasim as Ijaz

Bits & Pieces
 Washiya Mohamed as Zeeshan
 Mohamed Vishal as Hassan
 Ahmed Sharif as Amru
 Ibrahim Farhad as Siraj
 Shimal Hameed as Raaid

Guest
Rules & Regulations

 Nathasha Jaleel
 Aminath Shuha as Raina
 Aminath Silna as Sheena
 Aishath Shahufa 
 Mohamed Vishal
 Shera Adam
 Mohamed Shivaz as Ijaz's colleague
 Aminath Shaanaa Saeedh as Ijaz's colleague
 Muneez Ibrahim as Sana's crew
 Ali Nadheeh as Sana's crew
 Khadheeja Fainan as Sana's crew
 Mohamed Aiman as Sana's crew
 Aktar as Sana's crew

Bits & Pieces

 Fathimath Myeha as Shiu
 Aisha Ali as Amru's friend

Episodes

Soundtrack

Release and reception
The first episode of the series was released on 22 December 2021, to positive reviews from critics. Favoring the presentation of development of the episode Dho? applauded Ahmed Iqbal for his representation of modern love and breaking the stereotyped melodrama, which Maldivians are most familiar with.

References

Serial drama television series
Maldivian television shows
Maldivian web series